Trade Test Transmissions is the fourth studio album by English pop punk band Buzzcocks. It was released on 2 June 1993 by record label Castle and was their first release in fourteen years, following up 1979's A Different Kind of Tension. The music was quite different from their earlier material with nods to the power pop scene popular at the time.

Reception 

Trade Test Transmissions has been generally well received by critics.

Jason Crock of Pitchfork was generally favourable, though writing "the album remains a strictly diehards-only affair." CMJ later qualified it as "a superb record which oddly got lost in the shuffle".

Track listing 

All songs written and composed by Pete Shelley, except as noted.

Personnel 
Buzzcocks
 Pete Shelley – guitar, vocals
 Steve Diggle – guitar, vocals
 Tony Barber – bass
 Philip Barker – drums
Technical
 Ralph Ruppert - production
Ingo Vauk, Philip Bagenal - engineers
Malcolm Garrett - album design
Pete Towndrow - photography

References

External links 

 

1993 albums
Buzzcocks albums
Caroline Records albums